One third of Great Yarmouth Borough Council in Norfolk, England is elected each year, followed by one year without election. Since the last boundary changes in 2004, 39 councillors have been elected from 17 wards.

Great Yarmouth rejected the introduction of a directly elected mayor by 15,595 votes to 10,051 in a referendum in 2011, held at the same time as the 2011 election.

Political control
Since the first election to the council in 1973 political control of the council has been held by the following parties:

Leadership
The leaders of the council since 1999 have been:

Council elections
1973 Great Yarmouth Borough Council election
1976 Great Yarmouth Borough Council election
1979 Great Yarmouth Borough Council election
1980 Great Yarmouth Borough Council election (New ward boundaries)
1982 Great Yarmouth Borough Council election
1983 Great Yarmouth Borough Council election
1984 Great Yarmouth Borough Council election
1986 Great Yarmouth Borough Council election
1987 Great Yarmouth Borough Council election
1988 Great Yarmouth Borough Council election
1990 Great Yarmouth Borough Council election
1991 Great Yarmouth Borough Council election
1992 Great Yarmouth Borough Council election
1994 Great Yarmouth Borough Council election
1995 Great Yarmouth Borough Council election
1996 Great Yarmouth Borough Council election
1998 Great Yarmouth Borough Council election
1999 Great Yarmouth Borough Council election
2000 Great Yarmouth Borough Council election
2002 Great Yarmouth Borough Council election
2003 Great Yarmouth Borough Council election
2004 Great Yarmouth Borough Council election (New ward boundaries reduced the number of seats by 9)
2006 Great Yarmouth Borough Council election
2007 Great Yarmouth Borough Council election
2008 Great Yarmouth Borough Council election
2010 Great Yarmouth Borough Council election
2011 Great Yarmouth Borough Council election
2012 Great Yarmouth Borough Council election
2014 Great Yarmouth Borough Council election
2015 Great Yarmouth Borough Council election
2016 Great Yarmouth Borough Council election
2018 Great Yarmouth Borough Council election
2019 Great Yarmouth Borough Council election

Borough result maps

By-election results

1997-2001

2005-2009

2009-2013

References

 By-election results

External links
Great Yarmouth Council

 
Politics of the Borough of Great Yarmouth
Council elections in Norfolk
District council elections in England